Vaskas may refer to:
 Vaskas, Amol
 Vaskas, Qaem Shahr